The Paranapanema River (Portuguese, Rio Paranapanema) is one of the most important rivers of the interior of the Brazilian state of São Paulo. The river forms most of the boundary between the states of São Paulo and Paraná.

Course

The sources of the river are protected by the  Nascentes do Paranapanema State Park, created in 2012.

From the sources to the mouth of  the Itararé River, the Paranapaneba flows within the territory of São Paulo state. Below the Itararé the Paranapanema forms the border between the states of Paraná and São Paulo.

The river is associated with a date according to State Law 10.488/99 (Antônio Salim Curiati), sanctioned by Governor Mário Covas, designated as August 27.

The Paranapanema is the least polluted river of the state of São Paulo.

Gradient
The average total gradient of the Paranapanema River, from its sources to its mouth in the  Paraná river is 61 cm/km, not considering the first 100 km, where the river descends from the Serra of Paranapiacaba, at an average gradient of 43 cm/km, a value relatively low for a stream with a length of 929 km.

The Paranapanema river may be divided into three principal stretches:

Lower Paranapanema
From its mouth at the  Paraná River, to the Grande Falls, a length of 421 km, the average gradient is 29 cm/km. There are widths of more than 200 m, deeper and shallower stretches, widths that reach nearly 800 m. The radii of curvature are in the order of 1.000 m. The course is more or less meandering presenting a complete horizontal equilibrium, with an excess, only of the stretch close to the junction with the Paraná river, where one may notice the existence of moving sand-banks and islands.

Middle Paranapanema
From the Grande Falls up to the confluence with the Apiaí-Guaçu River, with a length of 328 km, the river descends a total of 210 m. It is not possible to calculate an average  gradient on this stretch, because due to the construction of various dams for the provisioning of hydroelectric power, the level will fall abruptly at those dams.

Upper Paranapanema

The Upper Paranapanema reaches from the confluence of the Apiaí-Guaçu River to the river's sources in the Serra de Agudos Grandes, with a length of 180 km. The average gradient is quite high, 150 cm/km. It drains a series of streams that descend from the Serra of Paranapiacaba, the Upper Paranapanema is gaining size and consolidates to receive the Itapetininga River and Apiaí-Guaçu river.

Navigation
Navigation of the Paranapanema River is practical along the lower course up to the port of Euclides da Cunha, down the chute of the Coroa do Frade, with a length of about 70 km, counting from the mouth into the Paraná river. Navigation is fairly hazardous.

The main natural obstacles that interrupt or make navigation dangerous are: a basalt bank, hidden rocks, reduced current velocity, too little depth, a straight canal in the middle of the river, an elevated current velocity, an undulating movement, a sinuous canal, sand banks, and stretches with high gradient.

The great reserves of water held in the Paranapanema's reservoirs have considerable influence on the regime of the river in its middle course. In the lower course the influence is reduced, with no effect on the natural conditions that completely impede navigation.

Dams and reservoirs
The Paranapanema River has in total eight dams and their respective reservoirs. The following table traces a list going in the direction of the Paraná River.

Photo gallery

See also
 Tributaries of the Río de la Plata

References

Paranapanema
Tributaries of the Paraná River
Rivers of Paraná (state)